Wilhelm "Willi" Giesemann (born 2 September 1937 in Rühme, a district of Braunschweig, Germany) is a former German football player.

Club career 
After the introduction of the West German top-flight in 1963 he appeared in 104 Bundesliga matches for Hamburger SV.

International career 
Half back Giesemann was part of the West Germany squad at the 1962 FIFA World Cup and played in two West German matches there.

He did miss out on participation at the then forthcoming World Cup because of injury, an injury that had an effect on the duration of his ability to play top-level football in the latter stages of his career, but sustained his toughest injury just on the day of his fourteenth and last West Germany appearance. On 6 June 1965, the West Germans played Brazil in Rio and battled hard to withstand the likes of Garrincha, Ademir and Pelé. Brazil was still in the lead, short before the end of the match when a tackle of Pelé saw marker Giesemann go off with a broken shinbone. And, it happened to be the famous Brazilian striker who netted the decisive second goal shortly after. Overall he won 14 caps.

References

External links
 
 
 
 

1937 births
Living people
Sportspeople from Braunschweig
German footballers
Germany international footballers
VfL Wolfsburg players
FC Bayern Munich footballers
Hamburger SV players
Bundesliga players
1962 FIFA World Cup players
Association football defenders
Footballers from Lower Saxony
20th-century German people